Derebucak Çamlık Caves National Park are a group of several caves located in Konya Province, central Turkey. They are registered together a natural monument of the country.

Derebucak Çamlık Caves are a group of 13 caves in total located at Çamlık town of Derebucak district in Konya Province. The caves are registered a natural monument in 2013. Since 2022 they have been declared a national park.

References

Caves of Turkey
Natural monuments of Turkey
National parks of Turkey
Landforms of Konya Province
Derebucak District
Protected areas established in 2013
2013 establishments in Turkey